54th Regiment may refer to:

 54th (City of London) Heavy Anti-Aircraft Regiment, Royal Artillery
 54th (West Norfolk) Regiment of Foot
 54th Foot, name of the 43rd (Monmouthshire) Regiment of Foot prior to 1751
 54th Regiment of Foot, name of the 52nd (Oxfordshire) Regiment of Foot prior to 1756
 54th Indiana Infantry Regiment
 54th Infantry Regiment (France)
 54th Infantry Regiment (Imperial Japanese Army)
 54th Infantry Regiment (United States)
 54th Massachusetts Infantry Regiment
 54th Massachusetts Volunteer Regiment
 54th New York Volunteer Infantry
 54th Ohio Infantry
 54th Pennsylvania Infantry Regiment
 54th Regiment Kentucky Volunteer Mounted Infantry
 54th United States Colored Infantry Regiment

See also 
 54th Division (disambiguation)